Pimelea gnidia is a species of small shrub in the family Thymelaeaceae.  It is endemic to New Zealand.  According to the New Zealand Threat Classification System (NZTCS), it is not threatened as of 2012.

Description
Pimelea gnidia grows up to 1.5 m tall, and grows pointed leaves and hairy white flowers.

References

gnidia
Flora of New Zealand